Psaeropterella macrocephala is a species of ulidiid or picture-winged fly in the genus Psaeropterella of the family Tephritidae.

References

Ulidiidae